Craig MacTavish (born August 15, 1958) is a Canadian professional ice hockey executive and former player, currently in an assistant coaching position with the St. Louis Blues. He played centre for 17 seasons in the National Hockey League with the Boston Bruins, Edmonton Oilers, New York Rangers, Philadelphia Flyers and St. Louis Blues, winning the Stanley Cup four times (1987, 1988, 1990, 1994). He was the last NHL player not to wear a helmet during games.

MacTavish later coached the Oilers from 2000 to 2009 and also served as assistant coach with the Rangers and Oilers. He last coached Team Canada at the 2019 Spengler Cup, after a short stint with Russian team Lokomotiv Yaroslavl of the KHL.

He is currently an assistant coach with the St. Louis Blues.

Early life and education 
MacTavish was born on August 15, 1958, in London, Ontario. 

After retiring as NHL player in 1997, MacTavish was accepted as an MBA student at the University of Alberta. He didn't start the program, following the decision to take a coaching position with the New York Rangers. In 2011, he obtained an EMBA from Queen's School of Business.

Career

Early career
MacTavish played two years of NCAA hockey with the University of Lowell Chiefs (now University of Massachusetts Lowell River Hawks) from 1977 to 1979.  He was drafted by the Boston Bruins in the 1978 NHL Entry Draft with their ninth pick, 153rd overall, and spent the next several years splitting time between the Bruins and various American Hockey League teams. He finally made the Bruins for good in 1982–83 and played two full seasons with them.

During his early days with the Bruins, the young MacTavish was involved in the infamous brawl between several Boston players and a group of New York Rangers fans in 1979.

MacTavish missed the 1984–85 season after being convicted of vehicular homicide, having struck and killed a young woman while he was driving under the influence of alcohol. MacTavish pleaded guilty to vehicular homicide and driving under the influence of alcohol the night of January 25, 1984, in Peabody, Massachusetts. Kim Radley, 26, of West Newfield, Maine, died four days later of injuries sustained in the crash. MacTavish was sentenced to a year's imprisonment for the offence. While incarcerated, he watched most of the games that were televised.

Later career
Widely viewed, at the time, as a personal favour from Edmonton general manager Glen Sather to his best friend, then-Bruins general manager Harry Sinden (who felt that MacTavish ought to have a fresh start away from Boston and had offered to let him out of his contract, which MacTavish had accepted), the Oilers took a chance on MacTavish and signed him for the 1985–86 season.  Sather's intuition turned out to be good, as MacTavish spent eight full seasons with the Oilers, helping them to win three Stanley Cups in 1987, 1988, 1990 and serving as team captain from 1992 to 1994. MacTavish was traded to the New York Rangers in 1994, just in time to help several other former Oilers (including Kevin Lowe, Glenn Anderson, Adam Graves, Jeff Beukeboom, Esa Tikkanen and Mark Messier) win the Stanley Cup.

The next season MacTavish signed with the Philadelphia Flyers as a free agent, and was traded to the St. Louis Blues during the 1995–96 season. MacTavish retired following the 1996–97 season. He was the last helmetless player, having signed a professional contract with the Bruins before the mandatory cutoff date in 1979 (then-current players were allowed to remain bare-headed under a grandfather clause); incidentally, MacTavish had worn a helmet in his earliest days as he can be seen wearing one during the aforementioned fight with Rangers fans in 1979.

Coaching career
MacTavish turned to coaching immediately after retiring as a player, signing on as an assistant with the Rangers. After two seasons in New York, he returned to the Oilers as an assistant coach in the 1999–2000 season under former teammate Kevin Lowe. He was subsequently promoted to the top job when Lowe succeeded Sather as general manager.

In the 2005–06 season, MacTavish led the Oilers on their run to the Stanley Cup Finals. In the first round of the playoffs, MacTavish shocked the hockey world by utilizing a trapping defensive system to neutralize a potent Detroit Red Wings offence. The Oilers were able to deny scoring chances by blocking shots with their bodies—something for which MacTavish was known for during his playing career. This proved effective; the eighth-seeded Oilers won the opening round in six games, against the no. 1 seed, the Detroit Red Wings for their postseason victory since 1997. Along the way the Oilers defeated the San Jose Sharks in six games and the Mighty Ducks of Anaheim in five games to advance to their first Stanley Cup since their championship season of 1990. However, the Oilers could not complete their run, losing a thrilling seven-game final series to the Carolina Hurricanes after nearly rallying from a 3–1 series deficit to force a Game 7. As it would turn out, this was the only season in MacTavish's tenure where the Oilers won a postseason series.

On November 4, 2006, one day after the Oilers lost to the Dallas Stars due to an apparent blown call in the last five seconds of the third period by referee Mick McGeough, MacTavish was fined $10,000 for expressing his anger after the game, referring to the call as "retarded". After this incident, Oilers fans collected over $10,000 and gave it to MacTavish, who subsequently donated the money to charity.

On April 15, 2009, Oilers general manager Steve Tambellini announced that MacTavish had been relieved of his duties as head coach of the club.  The Oilers had failed to reach the playoffs for the third year in a row. He finished his tenure with the Oilers at 36th on the all-time NHL list with 301 wins, and second on the Oilers' all-time wins list behind only Sather.

During the 2011–12 season, MacTavish coached the Chicago Wolves, the American Hockey League affiliate of the Vancouver Canucks.  After the season, MacTavish left the Canucks organization, returned to the Oilers as Senior Vice-president of Hockey operations and was named general manager on April 15, 2013.

On December 15, 2014, MacTavish fired head coach Dallas Eakins from his duties as head coach of the Oilers. MacTavish named himself as interim coach with the intention of transitioning minor league coach Todd Nelson into the role of interim head coach in the near future.

On May 16, 2019, he returned to coaching, signing a two-year contract with the Russian KHL team Lokomotiv Yaroslavl. On September 24, 2019, it was announced that Lokomotiv Yaroslav fired MacTavish after only eight games. In December 2019, he served as head coach of Team Canada and led the squad to the title at the Spengler Cup. He took over the head coaching job at Swiss team Lausanne HC on February 27, 2020.

On July 1, 2022, it was announced that MacTavish was hired by the St. Louis Blues as an assistant coach for the 2022-2023 season, after the Boston Bruins acquired Jim Montgomery as their head coach.

TSN commentator
Failing to be picked up by another team in the coaching department, on September 21, 2009, MacTavish began the first of twenty-five in-studio appearances with TSN as a hockey commentator.

Management career
On June 11, 2012, Edmonton Oilers general manager Steve Tambellini announced that McTavish was added to the club's hockey operations management team as senior vice-president of hockey operations.

On April 15, 2013, general manager Steve Tambellini was relieved of his position, and the Oilers named MacTavish as the new general manager. Former Columbus Blue Jackets GM Scott Howson replaced MacTavish as the vice-president of hockey operations. After two seasons, MacTavish was relieved of his position as general manager, and the Oilers named Peter Chiarelli the new general manager and president of hockey operations.

On April 24, 2015, Oilers Entertainment Group CEO, Bob Nicholson announced that Peter Chiarelli had been hired as the new general manager and president of hockey operations. Nicholson did not provide details on what MacTavish's new position would be within the Oilers organization.

On September 12, 2015, general manager Peter Chiarelli revealed in an interview with TSN's Bob McKenzie that MacTavish had been given the title of Vice-president of Hockey Operations; most of his duties would circulate around the Oilers' new affiliate team the Bakersfield Condors, his other main focus will be on pro scouting.

Personal life
MacTavish and his wife Debbie have a daughter and two sons.

While playing with the Flyers, MacTavish was a resident of Voorhees Township, New Jersey.

Career statistics

Regular season and playoffs

North American professional coaching record

Awards and achievements
1979 – Most Outstanding Player of the NCAA Division II Men's Ice Hockey Championship
1986–87 – Stanley Cup (Edmonton)
1987–88 – Stanley Cup (Edmonton)
1989–90 – Stanley Cup (Edmonton)
1993–94 – Stanley Cup (New York)
1995–96 – played in NHL All-Star Game

See also
List of NHL players with 1000 games played

Notes

External links
 
Oilers Heritage – Craig MacTavish

1958 births
Living people
Binghamton Dusters players
Boston Bruins draft picks
Boston Bruins players
Canada men's national ice hockey team coaches
Canadian expatriate sportspeople in Russia
Canadian ice hockey coaches
Canadian ice hockey centres
Canadian people convicted of manslaughter
Canadian people imprisoned abroad
Canadian people of Scottish descent
Chicago Wolves coaches
Edmonton Oilers coaches
Edmonton Oilers executives
Edmonton Oilers players
Edmonton Oilers scouts
Erie Blades players
Ice hockey people from Ontario
National Hockey League All-Stars
National Hockey League assistant coaches
New York Rangers coaches
New York Rangers players
People from Voorhees Township, New Jersey
Philadelphia Flyers players
Prisoners and detainees of Massachusetts
St. Louis Blues players
Sportspeople convicted of crimes
Sportspeople from London, Ontario
Springfield Indians players
Stanley Cup champions
UMass Lowell River Hawks men's ice hockey players